Abaújkér is a village in Borsod-Abaúj-Zemplén county, Hungary.

Jews lived in Abaújkér for many years until they were murdered in the Holocaust

References

External links 
 Street map 

Populated places in Borsod-Abaúj-Zemplén County
Jewish communities destroyed in the Holocaust